Blegywryd is a Welsh name which may refer to:

 Blegywryrd, a jurist sometimes credited with compiling the Laws of Hywel Dda
 Blegywryd, father of Aeddan (d. 1018), a ruler of Gwynedd

Welsh masculine given names